SOER may refer to:

Sustaining Oklahoma's Energy Resources
 Special Operations Engineer Regiment (Australia)
 State and Outlook of Europe's Environment, a report published by the European Environment Agency

See also
Soers
Soer-Varanger
Soer-Trondelag
Seur
 Surface-Oxidation-Enhanced Raman Scattering (SOERS), a Raman spectroelectrochemistry method
Soeur (disambiguation)